Sveva Caetani (August 6, 1917 – April 28, 1994), was an Italian-Canadian artist.

She immigrated to Canada in 1921 with her father, Leone Caetani, and her mother, Ofelia Fabiani. Leone, an Italian nobleman (Prince of Teano and Duke of Sermoneta), brought his second family to Canada due to irreconcilable differences in philosophy — he was a radical socialist and the regime in Italy was fascist.

Biography
Of Italian, English, French, Spanish, and Polish descent, Sveva Ersilia Giovanella Maria Fabiani was born in Rome. Her father, Leone Caetani, Prince of Teano (who became 15th Duke of Sermoneta shortly after her birth), was already married, to Princess Vittoria Colonna Caetani, and would remain so until his death. Her mother was his mistress, Ofelia Fabiani, daughter of a wealthy engineer in Rome. She had one half-sibling by her father's marriage, a brother, Onorato, 16th Duke of Sermoneta,  but lived with disabilities. Sveva bore her mother's surname, per Italian law, though it was changed to Caetani later in her childhood in Canada.

Though she spent her first years at Villa Miraggio, a five-story mansion built by her father on the Janiculum Hill in Rome, her parents left Italy to settle in Canada in the town of Vernon, British Columbia in 1921. There the duke purchased a late-19th-century wood house in the neighbourhood of East Hill. As her father wrote to a friend about the move, "This is not an abandonment of my country and my affairs but a return to simple nature, to a primitive life, a longing for peace and rest after the torment of war and the post-war period. A spiritual rest ..."

Sveva was educated by private tutors and governesses, as well as Crofton House School in Vancouver. During the first 10 years after arriving in Canada, the Caetani family frequently commuted back and forth between Canada and Europe, largely because Ofelia "found Canadian life rather too simple for her cosmopolitan tastes ..." Combining business with pleasure, the family's trips to Europe included visits to friends and relatives and stops at various real estate holdings. It was through this exceptional education that Sveva learned a love of art.

The Duke of Sermoneta lost much of his fortune in 1929, and when he died of throat cancer in 1935, Sveva's life changed dramatically. Her mother became mentally and physically ill, and it was at this time that Ofelia Fabiani began demanding Sveva stay at home, avoiding all contact with the outside world. Her mother was so distressed that she would suffer severe physical ailments, such as heart palpitations, whenever Sveva would leave.

After a brief period where her mother permitted Sveva's artistic pursuits Sveva was not allowed to engage in making artwork, and for the years she remained captive in the family home, books were virtually her only connection to the outside world.

In 1960 her mother died, leaving Sveva to pursue both independence and her artistic pursuits. After completing her teaching degree, she served the local area as an art instructor at Lumby's Charles Bloom Secondary. However, that wasn't the end of her contributions, as Sveva began painting a series of 56 watercolours intended to reflect her life. This series was titled "Recapitulation".

Works
 Recapitulation, 1989

Legacy
Sveva's Recapitulation series was bequeathed to the Alberta Foundation for the Arts, and her remaining paintings and her estate were donated to the City of Vernon upon her death in 1994.

Sveva Caetani's image is depicted in downtown Vernon along with her family in a mural painted by Michelle Loughery.

References

External links
 https://www.caetani.org/heritage/history/
 http://www.vernonpublicartgallery.com/index.php?option=com_content&view=article&id=65&Itemid=73
 http://memorybc.ca/sveva-caetani-fonds;rad
 http://www.artistsincanada.com/php/article.php?id=746

1917 births
1994 deaths
Canadian women painters
Italian emigrants to Canada
Artists from British Columbia
20th-century Canadian women artists